Gaussian optics is a technique in geometrical optics that describes the behaviour of light rays in optical systems by using the paraxial approximation, in which only rays which make small angles with the optical axis of the system are considered. In this approximation, trigonometric functions can be expressed as linear functions of the angles. Gaussian optics applies to systems in which all the optical surfaces are either flat or are portions of a sphere. In this case, simple explicit formulae can be given for parameters of an imaging system such as focal length, magnification and brightness, in terms of the geometrical shapes and material properties of the constituent elements.

Gaussian optics is named after mathematician and physicist Carl Friedrich Gauss, who showed that an optical system can be characterized by a series of cardinal points, which allow one to calculate its optical properties.

References

Geometrical optics